Huang was a vassal state that existed during the Zhou dynasty until the middle Spring and Autumn period. In the summer of 648 BC it was annexed by the state of Chu.

Its capital was in present-day Huangchuan County, Henan province, where ruins of the city have been excavated. Archaeologists have discovered the tombs of Huang Jun Meng (Meng, Lord of Huang) and his wife, with numerous bronzes, jades, and other artifacts.

References

Ancient Chinese states
History of Henan
7th-century BC disestablishments in China